The 2014 Texas Southern Tigers football team represented Texas Southern University in the 2014 NCAA Division I FCS football season. The Tigers were led by third-year head coach Darrell Asberry and played their home games at a BBVA Compass Stadium. They were a member of the West Division of the Southwestern Athletic Conference (SWAC). They finished the season 5–6, 3–6 in SWAC play to finish in a tie for 4th place in the West Division.

Schedule

References

Texas Southern
Texas Southern Tigers football seasons
Texas Southern Tigers football